A pubstro is a computer that has been cracked into, and had an FTP server installed. This FTP server is used to facilitate the transferring and spreading of warez, or copyrighted software.

This is typically accomplished by scanning broad IP address ranges with port scanners in search of servers running open ports that are vulnerable to attack by various scripts (e.g. CGI, PHP, VNC, etc.). The scripts are utilized to gain entry into the server whereupon the cracker uploads server software and creates logins. Many crackers will then patch the server against the very vulnerabilities they utilized to compromise the system thereby protecting it from being hijacked by other FXP groups.

Although widely used among FXP boards, pubstros are frowned upon in the warez scene.

See also
 Cybercrime
 Topsite (warez)

References
 Braithwaite, Richard, "The ‘pubstro’ phenomenon: Robin Hoods of the Internet" (2003). ACIS 2003 Proceedings. 104.
 Jelver, P.: Pubstro-hacking – Systematic Establishment of Warez Servers on Windows Internet Servers, Verified: July 24 (2003), July 23 (2002)
 
 Pubstro and pubbing explanations on aboutthescene.com.

Warez